On 12 February 2012, a Katanga Express Gulfstream IV business jet carrying several Congolese government officials overran the runway and crashed on landing at Kavumu Airport near Bukavu, Democratic Republic of the Congo. Two crew members and two passengers were killed, along with two people on the ground.

Victims 
Both the pilot and co-pilot were killed in the impact, along with two farmers on the ground. Two of the eight passengers were also killed: the former Governor of Katanga Province and President Kabila's closest advisor Augustin Katumba Mwanke and the ex-President Director General of OGEDEP (Office de Gestion de la Dette Publique) and national deputy for the district of Lukunga Oscar Dimageko Gema, who died of his injuries two weeks later.

Among the survivors was Finance Minister and future Prime Minister Augustin Matata Ponyo, who was seriously injured, and the roving ambassador of President Kabila and former Minister of Foreign Affairs Antoine Ghonda.

Aftermath 
After the crash, the government of the Democratic Republic of the Congo's decided to suspend the license of Katanga Express while the Congolese and American teams investigated the cause of the crash.

Katanga Express was listed as an air carrier banned from the European Union ten months later, in December 2012.

Investigation 
The investigation revealed that the airplane touched down about 1,200 meters past the threshold of the 2,000 meter runway. The 800 meters left for the landing rollout was insufficient to safely land a Gulfstream IV.

References 

2012 in the Democratic Republic of the Congo
Katanga Express Gulfstream IV crash
Aviation accidents and incidents in the Democratic Republic of the Congo
Bukavu
February 2012 events in Africa
2012 disasters in the Democratic Republic of the Congo